Nathaniel George Payos Burkey (born 7 January 1985) is a Filipino  former football player. He spent most of his career playing professionally in the Philippines. Burkey currently serves as the assistant coach of the Philippines national team. He played as a defensive midfielder during his college career and has since been playing as a forward at the senior club level and the national team.

Personal life and career
Nate was born in Washington, D.C. and grew up in Alexandria, Virginia just outside the U.S. capital. He attended T. C. Williams High School, where he played the center midfielder position for the Titans.
Nate's mother has Filipino roots, which made him eligible to represent the country on the international level. With family assistance, he reached out to the federation, joined semi-pro Kaya FC and was named to the national squad after he was invited to tryout in the training pool.

International goals 
Scores and results list the Philippines' goal tally first.

Coaching career

Philippines
In May 2022, Burkey was appointed by Philippines national team coach Thomas Dooley to be his assistant coach in the third round of 2023 Asian Cup Qualifiers.

Honors

Club
Kaya
United Football League: Runner-up 2012
PFF National Men's Club Championship : Third place 2013

References

External links

1985 births
Living people
Sportspeople from Alexandria, Virginia
Soccer players from Washington, D.C.
Citizens of the Philippines through descent
American sportspeople of Filipino descent
American soccer players
Filipino footballers
Filipino expatriate footballers
Philippines international footballers
Association football midfielders
Association football forwards
VCU Rams men's soccer players
Virginia Commonwealth University alumni
Kaya F.C. players
Ceres–Negros F.C. players
Davao Aguilas F.C. players
Louisburg Hurricanes men's soccer players
T. C. Williams High School alumni